Brock Christian Nelson (born October 15, 1991) is an American professional ice hockey player for the New York Islanders of the National Hockey League (NHL). Nelson was drafted 30th overall in the first round of the 2010 NHL Entry Draft by the Islanders. Prior to playing professional hockey, Nelson played at the University of North Dakota.  His first experience in professional hockey was at the American Hockey League (AHL) level with the Islanders' affiliate, the Bridgeport Sound Tigers.

Playing career

Early career
Nelson played hockey at Warroad High School, where he was a finalist for the Minnesota Mr. Hockey Award, given to the top Minnesota high school hockey player. He finished the 2009–10 season with 39 goals and 34 assists for 73 points in 25 games for Warroad. On September 24, 2009, Nelson committed to play Division 1 hockey for the University of North Dakota after considering Bemidji State and Nebraska-Omaha and later partook in the 2010 USA Hockey National Junior Evaluation Camp. Nelson was selected 30th overall by the New York Islanders of the National Hockey League (NHL) in the 2010 Entry Draft.

Collegiate
Nelson competed with the University of North Dakota Fighting Sioux for two seasons while majoring in pre-investments. He recorded his first collegiate goal on a power play to lift the Fighting Sioux 3–2 over Minnesota Duluth. Later in the season, he recorded his first two-goal game in a win over Robert Morris Colonials. He recorded a goal off an assist from Joe Gleason to help lead the Fighting Sioux to the WCHA Final Five. Nelson ended the season with the Tom Hoghaug Memorial Scholarship as he led all Sioux freshmen in points and goals. He was also named to the All-WCHA Team and WCHA All-Tournament Team.

In his sophomore season, Nelson played on a line with Corban Knight and Danny Kristo. By the conclusion of the 2011–12 season, Nelson was named to the All-WCHA Third Team after leading all WCHA players with 20 goals and becoming UND's youngest 20 goal scorer since Jonathan Toews. He was also named a Inside College Hockey All-American, to College Hockey News Second Team, and Inside College Hockey's WCHA Breakthrough Player of the Year. Nelson ended his collegiate career by signing an Entry Level Contract with the New York Islanders on April 3, 2012.

Professional career
Nelson began his professional career with the Islanders' minor league affiliate, the American Hockey League's (AHL) Bridgeport Sound Tigers after the 2011–12 season, during the 2012 Calder Cup playoffs. He eventually made his NHL debut during the 2013 Stanley Cup playoffs with the Islanders after the 2012–13 regular season. He registered his first NHL point the following season on October 8, 2013, an assist on a goal by Peter Regin in a 6–1 win against the Phoenix Coyotes. His first NHL goal was scored on October 22, 2013 against Roberto Luongo of the Vancouver Canucks.

On October 9, 2017, St. Louis Blues enforcer Robert Bortuzzo cross-checked Nelson multiple times while he was down after Nelson collided with a teammate. Bortuzzo was later fined $3,091.40.

On May 23, 2019, after a career year in the 2018–19 season with 53 points under Barry Trotz, Nelson signed a six-year, $36 million contract to remain with the Islanders.

On April 5, 2021, Nelson was named alternate captain of the Islanders in absence of the injured Anders Lee.

On November 23, 2021, it was announced that Nelson would be out 2-4 weeks with a lower body injury.

International play

Nelson plays internationally for the United States. At the 2011 World Junior Championships, Nelson helped the Americans to a bronze medal, recording one assist in 5 games. Nelson was selected as an alternate captain for Team USA in the 2017 IIHF World Championship.

Personal life
Nelson's uncle Dave Christian was on the 1980 United States Miracle on Ice gold medal team, and his grandfather, Bill Christian, and great uncle, Roger Christian, were both on the 1960 United States gold medal team and founded Christian Brothers, a company that made hockey sticks in Warroad, Minnesota from 1964 to 2003. Another great uncle, Gordon Christian played for the United States at the 1956 Winter Olympics, capturing a silver medal. While his mother did not partake in competitive hockey, she was a figure skater.

Nelson's wife Karley Sylvester is a former Ms. Hockey and competed on the University of Wisconsin women’s hockey team. Together, they have three children.

Career statistics

Regular season and playoffs

International

Awards and honors

References

External links
 

1991 births
Living people
American men's ice hockey centers
Bridgeport Sound Tigers players
Ice hockey people from Minneapolis
National Hockey League first-round draft picks
New York Islanders draft picks
New York Islanders players
North Dakota Fighting Hawks men's ice hockey players
People from Warroad, Minnesota